Italy competed at the 1984 Winter Olympics in Sarajevo, Yugoslavia (now Bosnia).

Medalists

Alpine skiing

Men

Women

Biathlon

Men

Men's 4 x 7.5 km relay

 1 A penalty loop of 150 metres had to be skied per missed target.
 2 One minute added per missed target.

Bobsleigh

Cross-country skiing

Men

Men's 4 × 10 km relay

Women

Women's 4 × 5 km relay

Figure skating

Women

Ice Dancing

Ice hockey

Group A
Top two teams (shaded ones) advanced to the medal round.

Sweden 11-3 Italy
USSR 5-1 Italy
Italy 6-1 Poland
Yugoslavia 5-1 Italy
West Germany 9-4 Italy

Luge

Men

(Men's) Doubles

Women

Ski jumping

Speed skating

Men

Women

References
Official Olympic Reports
International Olympic Committee results database
 Olympic Winter Games 1984, full results by sports-reference.com

Nations at the 1984 Winter Olympics
1984
Winter